Adventures of Robinson Crusoe, a Sailor from York is a 1982 Czechoslovak stop motion-animated film, with animated flashbacks, directed by Stanislav Látal. The film is based on the 1719 novel Robinson Crusoe by Daniel Defoe.

Plot summary

Differences from novel

Voice cast 
Václav Postránecký as Robinson Crusoe
Jiří Bruder
Stanislav Fišer
Dalimil Klapka

References

External links

1982 drama films
1982 films
1982 animated films
1980s Czech-language films
Films based on Robinson Crusoe
1980s stop-motion animated films
Czechoslovak adventure films
Czechoslovak animated films
Films directed by Stanislav Látal